Dumitru Captari (born 12 July 1989 in Chișinău) is a Moldovan-born Romanian male weightlifter, competing in the 77 kg category. Until 2015 he represented Moldova at international competitions, and since 2015 is representing Romania. He participated at the 2016 Summer Olympics in the men's 77 kg event. He competed at world championships, including at the 2015 World Weightlifting Championships.

He also participated at 2016 European Weightlifting Championships, where he won several medals. Thanks to these results Captari qualified for 2016 Summer Olympics. At the 2017 European Weightlifting Championships Captari won a silver medal at snatch and the gold medal in clean & jerk and overall ranking for 77 kg category.

Major results

References

External links
 
 
 
 

1989 births
Living people
Moldovan male weightlifters
Romanian male weightlifters
Olympic weightlifters of Romania
Naturalised citizens of Romania
Sportspeople from Chișinău
Weightlifters at the 2016 Summer Olympics
Moldovan expatriate sportspeople in Romania
European Weightlifting Championships medalists